Siegfried Ruff (19 February 1907 – 22 April 1989) was a German physician who served as director of the Aviation Medicine Department at the German Experimental Institute for Aviation.

Following World War II, Ruff was hired by the U.S. Army Air Forces to work at a United States military hospital in Heidelberg conducting experiments on human exposure to high altitudes. He was later indicted on various war crimes allegedly committed during his time as a researcher at the Institute for Aviation. Specifically, it was alleged he had overseen experiments that had resulted in the deaths of 80 Dachau concentration camp inmates. While Ruff acknowledged human experimentation had occurred, he stated it had occurred according to the law and denied it had resulted in any deaths. Ruff was acquitted of all charges against him during the Doctors' Trial. Nevertheless, in 1961 the International Academy of Aviation and Space Medicine chose to relocate its annual conference from West Germany over objections at Ruff's participation.

Ruff enjoyed a distinguished medical career in postwar Germany.

References

1907 births
1989 deaths
20th-century German physicians
Aviation medicine
People acquitted by the United States Nuremberg Military Tribunals